Knights of Badassdom is a 2013 American comedy horror film, directed by Joe Lynch, written by Kevin Dreyfuss and Matt Wall.  It stars Ryan Kwanten, Steve Zahn, Summer Glau, and Peter Dinklage.

Plot
In a forest, a group of friends are participating in a LARP when their activities are brought to an end by abusive "paintballers". Their friend Joe Revitt, a slacker, aspiring rockstar, and a fan of metal music, is dumped by his girlfriend Beth. Joe's friends Eric and Hung bring him unwillingly to a fantasy LARP event to cheer him up. Game master Ronnie Kwok, who was once humiliated by Joe as a result of an embarrassing Dungeons & Dragons incident, demands that Eric cast an advanced regeneration spell to allow Joe into the game. Eric recites a random passage from a grimoire he ordered online to allow Joe into the game, and unknowingly summons a succubus which resembles Beth.

Hung teaches Joe the rules of LARP combat, and Joe begins bonding with a female LARPer named Gwen. She is accompanied by her brutish cousin Gunther, who believes that the LARP event is an actual fantasy world and that he is an actual warrior. After the LARP event begins, the succubus begins murdering LARPers, including Hung and their friend Lando, with Ronnie narrowly escaping. Joe, Eric, Gwen, and Gunther discover the aftermath of the killings, and Ronnie informs Eric that the spell he recited was a genuine Enochian spell that can summon demons. They are confronted by the succubus, and Eric recites a different spell to mortally wound the succubus, but instead causes it to transform into a large monster.

The LARP battle of "Nevermore" is accidentally started early, and the LARPers begin fighting. Amidst the combat, the LARPers are ambushed by the paintballers from much earlier, who proceed to shoot them, scaring some of them away, while others take a stand against them. To make matters worse, the succubus monster suddenly appears and slaughters many of the LARPers, including Ronnie, and the aforementioned paintballers, with Johnny, one of the assistant game masters being the only survivor, due to Gunther's timely arrival. Joe, Eric, and Gwen arrive to confront the beast, and they manage to pin it in place with the paintballers' truck. Joe, brandishing a mystical gem taken from the spine of the grimoire, sings a spell in a metal style, causing a spectral version of Hung to appear and defeat the monster. Six months later, Joe and Gwen are shown to have started a doom metal band, vowing to never LARP again, and that Joe has "gotten over" his breakup with Beth. In light of the monster's rampage, Gunther's belief that he is an actual warrior is reinforced. Ronnie was posthumously recognized as "game master extraordinaire", Eric is learning Enochian, having become a "27 level sorcerer", and Hung's fight against the monster is now immortalized as legendary.

Cast
 Ryan Kwanten as Joe Revitt
Brendan McCreary as Joe's singing voice
 Steve Zahn as Eric
 Peter Dinklage as Hung
 Summer Glau as Gwen
 Margarita Levieva as Beth / Succubus
 Jimmi Simpson as Ronnie Kwok
 Brett Gipson/Tom Hopper as Gunther
 Danny Pudi as Lando
 Michael Gladis as King Diamond
 Douglas Tait as Abominog
 Brian Posehn as Gilberto
 Khanh Doan as Andie
 Basil Harris/Dan Anderson as Eddie
 Dan Anderson as Johnny
 Joshua Malina as Travis
 Brandon Petty as Jake
 Kim Stodel as Ira

Production
The film is directed by Joe Lynch, and stars Peter Dinklage, Ryan Kwanten, Steve Zahn and Summer Glau. Spectral Motion contributed the special effects in the film. The film was co-written by Kevin Dreyfuss and Matt Wall.

Filming began in July 2010 in and around Spokane, Washington. In September 2012, Wade Bradley of IndieVest reported Knights of Badassdom was still in "post-production" and that the film was anticipated to be released theatrically in "the first half of 2013."

On March 4, 2013 updates reported that an edit of the film was screened March 5, 2013 to potential buyers in Los Angeles.

On July 25, 2013, it was announced that Entertainment One had bought the North American distribution rights to the film with Wade Bradley negotiating the deal for IndieVest Pictures.

Some footage from the film and interviews with Douglas Tait are featured in the monster-movie documentary Men in Suits.

Initial DVD release on April 1, 2014.

As of March 2015 the film has been broadcast on Sky Movies in the UK, and Netflix in the United States.

Reception
On review aggregator Rotten Tomatoes, the film holds an approval rating of 67% based on 15 reviews, with an average rating of 5.07/10. On Metacritic, the film has a weighted average score of 56 out of 100, based on four critics, indicating "mixed or average reviews".

#ReleaseTheLynchCut campaign
Director Joe Lynch has since expressed disdain for the released version of the film and blamed the Media Society producers for removing the horror from the film, which inspired Twitter users calling for Lynch's cut, including Kevin Dreyfuss and Matt Wall through their shared Twitter account and is one of several anticipated horror director’s cuts according to Bloody Disgusting.

References

External links
 
 

2013 films
2010s English-language films
American comedy horror films
Demons in film
Films shot in Washington (state)
Films directed by Joe Lynch
Films scored by Bear McCreary
Succubi in film
2010s American films
2013 comedy horror films
English-language comedy horror films